Yogi's First Christmas is a 1980 animated musical television film starring Yogi Bear and produced by Hanna-Barbera which first aired in syndication through Operation Prime Time on November 22, 1980. Throughout the 1980s it was offered to U.S. television stations split up one episode per day for four days as a one-week strip syndicated program, generally showing the week of Christmas. The film was written by Willie Gilbert and directed by Ray Patterson.

Two songs from Casper's First Christmas ("Comin' Up Christmas Time" and "Making A Big To-Do") were featured in this film, in new re-recorded versions. Additionally, Boo Boo's song "Hope" was previously heard in two previous Christmas specials, A Christmas Story (1972) and A Flintstone Christmas (1977). Four songs from the soundtrack were released by Kid Rhino Records on the album Hanna-Barbera's Christmas Sing-A-Long in 1991, currently available on various streaming services.

In keeping with Hanna-Barbera's limited animation techniques, the film didn't have the full animation of a theatrical feature like 1964's Hey There, It's Yogi Bear, but was more detailed and elaborate than their standard TV work.

Plot
Yogi and his little pal, Boo Boo, are usually hibernating during the Christmas season, but this year they are awakened when Huckleberry Hound, Snagglepuss, Augie Doggie and Doggie Daddy come to Jellystone Lodge for the holiday. They are joined by Ranger Smith, hotel manager Mr. Dingwell, Otto the chef, and lodge owner Sophie Throckmorton and her spoiled brat of a nephew, Snively. The gang is obsessed with keeping Mrs. Throckmorton happy to keep her from closing down the lodge, which has become unpopular due to activity caused by Herman the Hermit, a grumpy Christmas-hating hermit who just wants to be left alone.

Yogi and Boo Boo are put to work as employees of the lodge when the music wakes them up and they enter the lodge through the kitchen where Otto works. Yogi is first ordered to operate the snowplow to which he saves Mrs. Throckmorton on the road from an avalanche caused by Herman. Later, Yogi is working as a bellhop, where he is tasked by Ranger Smith to stay on Mrs. Throckmorton's good side.

Though Snively tries to embarrass Yogi with his pranks, Yogi comes out on top. In another attempt to degrade Yogi, Snively tricks him into entering a figure skating contest, which Snively is also a participant. Although Snively earns high marks, Mrs. Throckmorton covertly wishes Snively would lose in order to tame his poor attitude. Yogi, the last contestant, manages to impress the judges well enough to earn the highest marks and win. Snively is a sore loser and enraged that Yogi beat him at his own game, but his aunt Sophie says that Yogi won fair and square and losing is a lesson of life.

Following different situations caused by Herman that Yogi saved her from, Mrs. Throckmorton has Mr. Dingwell promote Yogi to chief of security. Cindy Bear also awakens from her hibernation, to help Yogi out (due to her love and concern for him). Fed up with Snively's antics, Yogi gets revenge on him during an ice fishing contest, with Mrs. Throckmorton agreeing that he needed to be taught a lesson. Furious, Snively runs away and meets up with Herman, and the two team up to ruin Christmas. However, Yogi manages to thwart them every time.

Eventually, Herman and Snively are forgiven, invited to the Christmas celebrations and they have a profound change of heart at such generosity of spirit. Then in the midst of the festivities, Santa Claus plummets down the chimney bearing a picnic basket full of food for Yogi. Yogi, however, falls asleep, due to his natural instincts of hibernation. Santa then says that Yogi and Boo Boo can have the basket when they wake up in the spring. With that, the partiers return Yogi, Boo Boo and Cindy to their caves for the rest of their hibernation.

Cast
 Daws Butler - Yogi Bear, Snagglepuss, Huckleberry Hound, Augie Doggie
 Don Messick - Boo Boo, Ranger John Francis Smith, Herman the Hermit
 John Stephenson - Doggie Daddy, Mr. Marty Dingwell
 Janet Waldo - Cindy Bear, Mrs. Sophie Throckmorton
 Marilyn Schreffler - Snively
 Hal Smith - Otto the Chef, Santa Claus
 Sue Allen - Singer
 Paul DeKorte - Singer
 Edie Lehmann - Singer
 Marilyn Powell - Singer
 Andrea Robinson - Singer
 John Richard Bolks - Singer
 Darlene Lawrence - Singer
 Michael Redman - Singer
 Ida Sue McCune - Singer

Home media
The holiday TV movie was first released on VHS via Worldvision Home Video (now called CBS Home Entertainment) in 1983, and later re-released in association with Kids Klassics Home Video in 1986. It was then released on DVD as part of the manufactured-on-demand Warner Archive Collection on November 17, 2009.

See also
The Huckleberry Hound Show
The Yogi Bear Show
The Quick Draw McGraw Show
Casper's First Christmas
Yogi Bear's All Star Comedy Christmas Caper

Follow-up film
Yogi Bear's All Star Comedy Christmas Caper was released in 1982.

References

External links

 

1980 television films
1980 in American television
1980 animated films
1980 films
1980 television specials
1980s American animated films
Yogi Bear television specials
Huckleberry Hound films
Hanna-Barbera animated films
Hanna-Barbera television specials
American television films
American animated television films
Animated Christmas television specials
Christmas television films
Christmas television specials
Operation Prime Time
Animated crossover films
Yogi Bear films
Films directed by Ray Patterson (animator)
1980s children's animated films